Echinocactus grusonii or Kroenleinia grusonii, popularly known as the golden barrel cactus, golden ball or mother-in-law's cushion, is a species of barrel cactus which is endemic to east-central Mexico.

It is rare and endangered in the wild, where it is found near Mesa de León in the state of Querétaro, and in the state of Hidalgo. The population was critically reduced in the 1990s, by the creation of the Zimapán Dam and reservoir in Hidalgo.

Taxonomy
Echinocactus grusonii belongs to the small genus Echinocactus, which together with the related genus Ferocactus, are commonly referred to as barrel cacti. The species was first described by German plantsman Heinrich Hildmann in 1891. While sometimes referred to as golden ball, this species is not to be confused with Notocactus leninghausii which have fuzzy, harmless spines and are native to Brazil and Paraguay.

Recent phylogenetic studies have found that Echinocactus grusonii is probably polyphyletic with respect to the rest of Echinocactus, and is probably derived from hybrids between Echinocactus and Ferocactus. To correct this, Echinocactus grusonii has been moved to its own genus, and under this scheme the correct name would be Kroenleinia grusonii Lodé. However, not all authorities have accepted this move so far.

Description
Younger Golden Barrel plants do not look similar to mature specimens. The generation lifetime is estimated to be 30 years.

There may be up to 35 pronounced ribs in mature plants, though they are not evident in young plants, which may have a knobbly appearance. The sharp spines are long, straight or slightly curved, and various shades of yellow or, occasionally, white.

Small yellow flowers appear in summer around the crown of the plant, but only after twenty years or so.

Cultivation

Echinocactus grusonii is widely cultivated by specialty plant nurseries as an ornamental plant, for planting in containers, desert habitat gardens, rock gardens, and in conservatories. A white-spined form, and a short-spined form, are also in cultivation.

It is one of the most popular cacti in cultivation and has increasingly become popular as an architectural accent plant in contemporary garden designs.

The cactus is considered easy and relatively fast growing in warmer climates around the world. The plants do have some basic requirements; an average minimum winter temperature of 12 °C (53.6 °F); and good drainage with less watering in winter. Excess water in cool periods may lead to rot. Golden Barrels are hardy to about −8 °C (15 °F) for brief periods.

Beyond Central Mexico, Echinocactus grusonii specimens may also be seen in collections of desert plants in many botanical gardens. In the UK it has gained the Royal Horticultural Society’s Award of Garden Merit.

Gallery

See also
Cacti of Mexico

References

External links

grusonii
Cacti of Mexico
Endemic flora of Mexico
Flora of Central Mexico
Flora of Hidalgo (state)
Flora of Querétaro
Critically endangered biota of Mexico
Critically endangered flora of North America
Garden plants of North America
Drought-tolerant plants